Tania Franco Klein (born November 18, 1990) is a Mexican interdisciplinary artist working primarily in photography.

Franco Klein’s book Positive Disintegration (2019) was nominated for the Paris Photo–Aperture Foundation PhotoBook Awards.

Life and work 
Franco Klein was born in Mexico City in 1990.

She studied Architecture in her hometown and in 2016 she received her master's degree at the University Of The Arts London.

After leaving London, while living as a nomad she began examining modern anxieties for the creation of her first long term project Our Life In The Shadows (2016-2018). She cites Byung-Chul Han’s book The Burnout Society and Kazimierz Dąbrowski’s theory of positive disintegration as the underlying concept for this body of work. This series was published in 2019 by Editions Bessard as a monograph under the name Positive Disintegration. And received a nomination for the Paris Photo– Aperture Foundation PhotoBook Awards.

In 2018 Franco Klein began working on her ongoing long term project Proceed To The Route (titled after the command some GPS applications give to users who have strayed off course). For the project she uses this command as a metaphor to convey how pre-established life in today's society can be. The series unfolds in the non-places a term coined by the French anthropologist Marc Augé.

At the beginning of 2019 W Magazine named her as one of the 9 young photographers to follow that year.

In the fall of 2019 her exhibition Proceed To The Route was presented by ROSEGALLERY in Santa Monica, Bergamot (arts center). The show compiled pieces from various bodies of work presented as photographs and wallpapers arranged and juxtaposed in unexpected configurations. In 2020 it was selected as one of the top ten exhibitions of the year in Los Angeles by art critic Annabel Osberg, who wrote a review of the show for ARTFORUM. Jacqui Palumbo at CNN described it as “a series that saturates dystopian unease in the warmth of nostalgia.”

In 2021 she collaborated with academy award nominee Yalitza Aparicio to publish a book of photographs released by King Kong Magazine. That same year, she photographed 4 of the 61 woman who accused Andres Roemer of sexual abuse for TIME magazine. Her portrait was selected as one of the best of the year by TIME.

Franco Klein currently lives and works in Mexico City.

References 

Mexican women photographers
1990 births
Living people
Artists from Mexico City
Mexican expatriates in the United Kingdom
Alumni of the University of the Arts London
21st-century Mexican photographers